Amarlo Herrera (born September 20, 1991) is a former 
American football linebacker. He played college football at Georgia, and was drafted by the Indianapolis Colts in the sixth round of the 2015 NFL Draft. He has also been a member of the Washington Redskins.

College career
Herrera played at the University of Georgia from 2011 to 2014. During his career he started 43 of 54 games and recorded 334 tackles, 3.5 sacks and three interceptions.

Professional career

Indianapolis Colts
Herrera was drafted by the Indianapolis Colts in the sixth round (207th overall) of the 2015 NFL Draft. He agreed to terms with the Indianapolis Colts on May 6. Herrera spent the first 5 weeks of the 2015 season on the practice squad, and was elevated to the 53-man roster for week 6. He was waived on October 20, and signed to the practice squad the following day. On December 15, 2015, Herrera was waived by the Indianapolis Colts. He was re-signed on December 29. 
On August 10, 2016, Herrera was released by the Colts.

Tennessee Titans
On August 12, 2016, Herrera was claimed off waivers by the Tennessee Titans. On August 28, 2016, Herrera was waived by the Titans.

Washington Redskins
On September 19, 2016, Herrera was signed to the Redskins' practice squad. He was released from the Redskins' practice squad on September 27, 2016.

WWE (2017)
On June 17, 2017 it was reported on wwe.com that Herrera had attended a tryout for the WWE.

References

External links
 Indianapolis Colts bio
 Georgia Bulldogs bio

1991 births
Living people
Sportspeople from College Park, Georgia
Players of American football from Georgia (U.S. state)
American football linebackers
Georgia Bulldogs football players
Indianapolis Colts players
Tennessee Titans players
Washington Redskins players